Pierpont, West Virginia may refer to:

Pierpont, Monongalia County, West Virginia
Pierpont, Wyoming County, West Virginia